Xin Changxing (born December 1963) is a Chinese politician and the current Communist Party Secretary of Jiangsu. Previously, he served as Communist Party Secretary of Qinghai, Governor of Qinghai, and Deputy Communist Party Secretary of Anhui. Xin is a lifelong civil servant.

Biography
Xin graduated from Qufu Normal University in 1983 with a degree in political science. In 1986, he obtained a master's degree in economics from the Huazhong Normal University. After graduating, he was assigned to the Ministry of Labour to work in an institute under its jurisdiction. Thereafter he conducted research on compensation structures. He then went to Taiyuan Iron and Steel Group to work in human resources and labour policy. He experienced growth in the field, eventually being sent back to the Ministry of Labour to take on administrative roles, and also took on a brief stint as the vice-mayor of Xi'an.

In July 2008, he was named deputy director of the State Administration of Civil Service; in September 2010, he was named vice-minister of Human Resources and Social Security. In August 2014, he was named director of the State Administration of Civil Service.

In October 2016, Xin was appointed deputy party secretary of Anhui Province.

In July 2020, Xin was appointed deputy party secretary of Qinghai. On August 1, he was named the acting governor. On August 26, he was elected as the governor. In March 2022, he was made Communist Party Secretary of Qinghai, succeeding Wang Jianjun.

Xin is an alternate member of the 19th Central Committee of the Chinese Communist Party.

References

1963 births
Living people
Qufu Normal University alumni
Politicians from Binzhou
Chinese Communist Party politicians from Shandong
Alternate members of the 19th Central Committee of the Chinese Communist Party
Governors of Qinghai